Kyung-taek, also spelled Kyong-taek, is a Korean male given name.

People with this name include:
Kim Kyong-taek, South Korean academic, president of Dongkang College
Kwak Kyung-taek (born 1966), South Korean film director
Song Kyung-Taek (born 1983), South Korean short track speed skater

Fictional characters with this name include:
Koo Kyung-taek, in 2006 South Korean television series One Fine Day

See also
List of Korean given names

References

Korean masculine given names